Trimble could refer to:

Places 
United States
 Trimble, Alabama (Cullman County)
 Trimble, Colorado, an unincorporated community
 Trimble, Georgia (Troup County)
 Trimble, Illinois (Crawford County)
 Trimble, Kentucky (Pulaski County)
 Trimble, Missouri (Clinton County)
 Trimble, Ohio (Athens County)
 Trimble, Tennessee (Dyer County)
 Trimble, Virginia (Highland County)
 Trimble's Iron Works, Kentucky (Greenup County—Historical town)
 Trimble's Mills, North Carolina (Duplin County—Historical town)
 Trimble County, Kentucky
 Trimble Island, Puget Sound, Washington
 Trimble Knob, Virginia
 Trimble Technical High School, Fort Worth, Texas
 Mount Trimble, West Virginia
 Trimble Mountain, Maine

Other uses
 Trimble (surname), including a list of people with the name
 Trimble Inc., an American multinational technology company